Shazalee bin Ramlee (born 28 July 1994), is an Australian professional footballer who plays as a central midfielder for National Premier Leagues Western Australia club Rockingham City. 

In 2016, Ramlee signed his first professional contract with Johor Darul Ta'zim II in the Malaysia Premier League.

Early life

He was born in Perth, Western Australia, to Malaysian parents.

References

External links

1994 births
Living people
Australian people of Malay descent
Association football midfielders
Australian soccer players
Malaysian footballers
Penang F.C. players
Malaysia Super League players